Oded Menashe (born 29 September 1969) is an Israeli actor, magician and television presenter.

Filmography
 1992 - Inyan Shel Zman
 1999 - Around the World in Eighty Days
 2004 - HaPijamot
 2005 - Ringer is me
 2007 - The champion
 2008 - Custody
 2011 - Sabri Maranan

Private life 
His spouse is the Israeli actress and former MTV Europe VJ, Eden Harel. The couple married on February 22, 2007, and have six children together. Their first son was born on January 29, 2008. They live in Ramat HaSharon.

References

External links

Israeli Jews
Israeli television presenters
Israeli people of Afghan-Jewish descent
Israeli people of Austrian-Jewish descent
Israeli people of Hungarian-Jewish descent
Living people
1969 births
Israeli male television actors
Jewish Israeli male actors
Jewish singers